May Morning is an annual event in Oxford, United Kingdom, on May Day (1 May).

Event
The event starts early at 6 a.m. with the Magdalen College Choir singing a hymn, the Hymnus Eucharisticus, from the top of Magdalen Tower, a tradition stretching back over 500 years. The choir traditionally also sings a madrigal, Now Is the Month of Maying, following prayers for the city led by the Dean of Divinity. Large crowds of both students and Oxford residents normally gather under the tower, along the High Street, and on Magdalen Bridge. Students and fellows of Magdalen College gather in the college cloisters and on top of the other towers within the college grounds. In 2017 the event took place during the Bank Holiday weekend, and a record 27,000 people gathered to hear Sol Samba. During the 2020 Coronavirus pandemic the event was cancelled, however the choir recorded a 'Virtual May Morning', originally broadcast live.

This is then followed by general revelry and festivities including Morris dancing in Radcliffe Square between the University Church and the Radcliffe Camera, impromptu music, etc., for a couple of hours from around 6.15am onwards. There is a party atmosphere, despite the early hour. In fact, in some years there are all-night balls the night before, so some people, especially students, are in formal attire.

There is a modern tradition of students jumping from Magdalen Bridge. This occurred sporadically in the 1960s, becoming an annual event by the 1980s. However the river is sometimes shallow, which has on occasion caused serious injury, notably in 1997 when one person was left paralyzed, and 2005 when ten were hospitalised. Hence the bridge was closed every May Morning 1998–2001 and 2006–2009.

In the 19th century, the young townsmen blew horns and ran riot, after the singing. Activities have varied over the previous centuries.  Vera Brittain wrote a poem with the title May Morning in 1916. The first ten lines depict the actual event. One fictional description of the Tudor May Morning is in "Towers in the Mist" by Elizabeth Goudge. Another description is found in the film Shadowlands directed by Richard Attenborough, on an episode in the life of the English scholar, writer and fellow of Magdalen's C. S. Lewis, starring Anthony Hopkins as C. S. Lewis and Debra Winger as Joy Davidman.

During the covid-19 pandemic lockdowns, May Morning was hosted online in 2020 and 2021.

After two years of lockdown, May Morning began once more in earnest in 2022. Approximately 12,500 people crowded the streets to welcome the return of the festivities.

See also
English traditions on May Day
The Oxcentrics, a jazz band that played on May Mornings in the 1970s

References

External links
Music for a May Morning CD from Magdalen College
May Morning 2003 from the BBC
Morning, Magdalen Tower by William Holman Hunt (1890)

Terminology of the University of Oxford
Magdalen College, Oxford
Spring traditions
History of Oxford
Culture in Oxford
History of the University of Oxford
Culture of the University of Oxford
May events
English traditions
Events in Oxford